János Dezső Aczél  (26 December 1924 – 1 January 2020), also known as John Aczel, was a Hungarian-Canadian mathematician, who specialized in functional equations and information theory.

Professional career
Aczél earned a doctorate in mathematical analysis from the University of Budapest, and held positions at the University of Cologne, Kossuth University, University of Miskolc, and University of Szeged.  He joined the University of Waterloo faculty in 1965, eventually becoming Distinguished Professor in the Department of Pure Mathematics.

He was the founder of the journal Aequationes Mathematicae, first published in 1968, and remained its honorary editor-in-chief.

Awards and honors
Aczél held honorary degrees from the University of Karlsruhe, the University of Graz, and the University of Silesia in Katowice.
In 1971, he was elected a fellow of the Royal Society of Canada. He was the 1988 winner of the Santiago Ramón y Cajal Medal. In 1990, he became an external member of the Hungarian Academy of Sciences, and, in 2004, he was honored by the academy as one of the "big five" most distinguished Hungarian mathematicians. The other honorees were John Horvath, Steven Gaal, Ákos Császár and László Fuchs. In 2008, he became an honorary member of the Hamburg Mathematical Society, the oldest active mathematical society in the world.

In 2004, he won the Kampé de Fériet Award of the annual Information Processing and Management of Uncertainty conference, "for his pioneering work on the theory of functional equations, with applications in many fields, such as information measures, index numbers, group decision making, aggregation, production functions, laws of science, theory of measurement and utility theory."

Issues of the journal Aequationes Mathematicae were dedicated to Aczél in 1999, 2005, and 2010, in honor of his 75th, 80th, and 85th birthdays. He died six days after his 95th birthday on 1 January 2020.

Selected publications

Articles

Books
Aczél was the author or co-author of:

.
. Previously published in German as Vorlesungen über Funktionalgleichungen und ihre Anwendungen (Birkhäuser, 1961).
.
.
.

He was the editor of:
  (1st edition 1984)
  (1st edition 1995)

References

External links 
 Aczél's homepage at the Hungarian Academy of Sciences.
 
 Author profile in the database zbMATH

1924 births
2020 deaths
20th-century Hungarian mathematicians
Canadian mathematicians
Hungarian emigrants to Canada
Naturalized citizens of Canada
Members of the Hungarian Academy of Sciences
Academic staff of the University of Waterloo
Fellows of the Royal Society of Canada
Mathematicians from Budapest